"Fashion Week" is a song by British producer Steel Banglez, featuring vocals from rappers AJ Tracey and MoStack. Following its premiere as BBC Radio 1 DJ Annie Mac's Hottest Record, it was released as a single through Gifted Music on 21 March 2019, peaking at number seven on the UK Singles Chart. The song was written by Montell Daley, Paul Goller, Ché Grant, Pahuldip Sandhu, and Keven Wolfsohn, and produced by Banglez and The Elements.

Track listing

Charts

Certifications

References

2019 songs
2019 singles
Steel Banglez songs
AJ Tracey songs
MoStack songs
Songs written by AJ Tracey
Songs written by MoStack